Texas Children's Hospital is a nationally ranked, freestanding 973-bed, acute care women's and children's hospital located in Houston, Texas. It is the primary pediatric teaching hospital affiliated with Baylor College of Medicine and is located within the Texas Medical Center. The hospital provides comprehensive pediatric specialty and subspecialty care to infants, children, teens, and young adults aged 0–21 throughout Texas and features an ACS verified level I pediatric trauma center. Its regional pediatric intensive-care unit and neonatal intensive care units serve the Southern United States region and also has programs to serve children from around the world. With 973 beds, it is the largest children's hospital in the United States. 

In addition to its main site in the Texas Medical Center, Texas Children's Hospital has satellite campuses in the suburb of The Woodlands and at its West Campus near Houston's Energy Corridor neighborhood. Texas Children's also has a network of clinics throughout the Houston metropolitan area and maintains partnerships with sites across the world through the Texas Children's Global Health Network.

Texas Children's Hospital is ranked as one of the best children's hospitals in the country and the world. The 2022-2023 edition of U.S. News & World Report ranked Texas Children's Hospital #2 amongst 200 pediatric hospitals in the nation, and it has been recognized on the U.S. News & World Report Honor Roll for fourteen consecutive years.

History 
In 1940, the Texas Medical Center was first chartered as a set district. Texas Children's Foundation is formed to gain support to build a children's hospital and 6 acres were set aside for the planned hospital. Groundbreaking for the new building was held in May 1951.

As the hospital was being built, hospital leaders established a relationship with the Baylor College of Medicine to allow students to be taught at the new hospital. The original Texas Children's Hospital was planned to have 3 floors and 106 beds.

Texas Children's Hospital was first opened on February 1, 1954, creating the first children's hospital in Texas. From the start in 1954, physician-in-chief Russell Blattner, established a new policy that at least one parent may be with a child during a hospital stay, setting a standard for parental visitation now commonly seen at children's hospitals around the world.

In 1962, Texas Children's Hospital partnered with St. Luke's Episcopal Hospital to open up the Texas Heart Institute. Years later Texas Children's Hospital separated from the Texas Heart Institute instead establishing their own pediatric cardiology program.

Over the years, patient numbers at Texas Children's Hospital continuously increased. The hospital completed a $149-million expansion in 1989 that constructed two new buildings; the West Tower and the Wallace Tower. In addition to the new buildings, the hospital also renovated the main building known as the Abercrombie Building.

On September 21, 1971, the patient known as "Bubble Boy," David Vetter was born at the Texas Children's Hospital. Vetter was immediately placed into a sterile "bubble" because of his SCID diagnosis. The boy lived in the hospital throughout his life before being discharged a few years later. Eventually he went to the Dana–Farber Cancer Institute for an experimental stem cell transplant, but died days later after contracting Epstein–Barr from the marrow, which had been undetectable in the pre-transplant screening.

By 1993, the hospital officially had 465 licensed beds.

When Hurricane Katrina first hit New Orleans in August 2005, Texas Children's (along with other hospitals) sent helicopters to Tulane Medical Center, Ochsner, and CHNOLA in order to help evacuate pediatric patients from the hospital. In addition to helicopters, Texas Children's sent multiple fixed wing aircraft, ambulances, doctors, and nurses to Baton Rouge to help with patient care in New Orleans. In the aftermath of the storm, Texas Children's Hospital and Baylor College of Medicine also took in pediatric residents from Tulane to continue their education. Texas Children's Hospital was the primary pediatric evacuation hospital during Hurricane Katrina.

Texas Children's completed a capital campaign in 2018, called Promise: The Campaign for Texas Children's Hospital, which was intended to meet the needs of a growing patient population who have a wider spectrum of complex needs. The campaign raised $575 million and included construction of Texas Children's Hospital The Woodlands, which provides pediatric care for families in the communities north of Houston, as well as construction of the Lester and Sue Smith Legacy Tower in the Texas Medical Center. This building houses additional surgical and critical care services and Texas Children's Heart Center, including an Adult Congenital Heart department.

In November 2020, Dwayne "The Rock" Johnson collaborated with Microsoft and billionaire Bill Gates to donate Xbox Series X consoles to the Texas Children's Hospital along with 19 other children's hospitals throughout the country.

Research
Also at TMC, The Baylor College of Medicine and Texas Children's also operate the nation's only Children's Nutrition Research Center, a United States Department of Agriculture facility that researches the nutritional needs of pregnant women, nursing women, children, teens, and young adults.

The hospital operates several research centers, including the David Center, which was established in 1984 to honor David Vetter, the twelve-year-old also known as the "Bubble Boy," who died of a rare immune-system disorder. The David Center is dedicated solely to treating immunological-deficiency diseases, especially those involving the development of cancer.

Adult programs
In addition to their pediatric specialties, Texas Children's Hospital serves adults through a couple of their nationally recognized programs. Texas Children's Hospital has one of the largest adult congenital heart disease programs in the U.S., and recently opened up a 16-bed inpatient unit to care for adults with congenital heart disease (legacy tower).

Additionally, it houses the 106-bed Texas Children's Hospital - Pavilion for Women, providing gynecological and maternity care for women of all ages.

In the wake of the COVID-19 pandemic, Texas Children's Hospital opened up their units to adult patients of all ages to reduce the load on adult hospitals in the area. Texas Children's Hospital accepted adults – both those who had COVID-19, and those that tested negative but were in the hospital for unrelated reasons.

Rankings and recognition
In 2013, Parents Magazine listed the hospital as #7 on their Top 10 U.S. Children's Hospitals list.

In 2016, the hospital was named as one of the "100 great hospitals in America" by the publication Becker's Hospital Review.

In 2017 Texas Children's Hospital was recognized for "facility management excellence" by the American Society for Health Care Engineering.

In 2020, Texas Children's was listed on Newsweek's World's Best Specialized Hospitals list for pediatrics.

The 2022–2023 edition of U.S. News & World Report ranked Texas Children's Hospital as the 2nd best children's hospital in the United States. Texas Children's Hospital is 1 of 10 hospitals designated on the U.S. News & World Report Honor Roll, which is reserved to hospitals that rank in all 10 subspecialties surveyed.

Facilities 
Texas Children's Hospital is made up of many buildings including three hospital campuses, research centers, multiple specialty care centers, primary care offices, and urgent care centers. Texas Children's Hospital is currently under rapid expansion throughout Texas.

Texas Medical Center 

The main campus of Texas Children's Hospital is located in the Texas Medical Center. The Texas Children's Hospital buildings include inpatient facilities in Legacy Tower, West Tower, Pavilion for Women, and the Abercrombie building. Also located at the Texas Medical Center campus is the outpatient Wallace Tower, and the research buildings: the Jan and Dan Duncan Neurological Research Institute and the Children's Nutritional Research Center.

West Campus 
In addition to the main Texas Medical Center campus, Texas Children's also has a hospital located in west Houston, Texas Children's Hospital West Campus. The hospital has 94 pediatric beds, 2 procedure rooms, and 8 operating rooms. The hospital originally opened on December 1, 2010, as just an outpatient hospital before their expansion, adjacent to the Houston Methodist Hospital West. The campus is notable for containing the first pediatric biocontainment unit in the country. The west campus also has a helipad to transport critical cases to the main campus.

The hospital is listed as one of The Leapfrog Group's Top Children's Hospitals for both the 2018 list and the 2019 list.

The Woodlands 
Texas Children's Hospital The Woodlands originally opened its outpatient tower in October 2016. The hospital's inpatient tower features 85 pediatric beds and the area's only dedicated pediatric emergency room.

In early 2020, supermarket chain, Kroger donated $100,000 to Texas Children's-The Woodlands to help in the fight against childhood hunger.

Austin 
In mid 2020 officials from Texas Children's announced that plans were made to build and open a new children's hospital in Northwest Austin, Texas. The plans are for a $450 million, 360,000 square foot hospital with 48 beds and shell space for future expansion. The announcement comes at a time when Austin based Dell Children's Medical Center also has plans to open a new children's hospital in North Austin. The expansion of pediatric services is attributed to the fact that Austin is one of the fastest-growing cities in America. The hospital is expected to be complete in 2023.

Texas Children's Cancer Center 
Texas Children's Cancer and Hematology Center is one of the largest pediatric oncology and blood disease centers in the United States.  The 2021–22 edition of U.S. News & World Report ranked Texas Children's Hospital #4 in the subspecialty of pediatric cancer within the United States. It is located in Houston, Texas.

The hospital provides comprehensive pediatric specialties and subspecialties to infants, children, teens, and young adults aged 0–21 throughout Texas.

The facilities of the multidisciplinary center, located at Texas Children's Hospital in the Texas Medical Center, includes a 36-bed inpatient unit, a  outpatient clinic and a 15-bed bone marrow transplant unit, as well as 47 research laboratories. Each year the center provides a specialized level of care to more than 4,000 children and adolescents newly diagnosed with cancer and blood diseases.

History 
Originally called the Research Hematology-Oncology Service, Texas Children's Cancer Center was founded by Dr. Donald J. Fernbach in January 1958. The National Cancer Institute provided the first grant that the center was funded on.

In 1959, the first bone marrow transplant from one identical twin to another was performed by Fernbach; this was one of the first procedures of its kind for aplastic anemia.

The Hematology Center at Texas Children's Hospital has been treating children diagnosed with hematological disorders since 1958.

Notable people
President and CEO
Mark Wallace
Physicians-in-Chief
Russell Blattner, M.D. — founding physician-in-chief, 1954-1977
Ralph Feigin, M.D. – physician-in-chief, 1977–2008
Mark Kline, M.D. – physician-in-chief, 2008–2020, Texas Children's Hospital; former Chairman of the Department of Pediatrics, Baylor College of Medicine; former President of the Baylor International Pediatric AIDS Initiative, Baylor College of Medicine
Physicians
Jennifer Arnold, M.D. – neonatologist, profiled on the television series The Little Couple
 Benjy F. Brooks, M.D. — first female pediatric surgeon in Texas 
Charles Fraser, Jr., M.D. – surgeon-in-chief, 2010–2019
Peter Hotez, M.D., Ph.D. – director of the Texas Children's Hospital Center for Vaccine Development 
Charles Mullins – cardiologist (1970–2006); has been called "the father of modern interventional pediatric cardiology"
David Poplack, M.D. – former director, Texas Children's Cancer Center, Professor of Pediatrics.
Bruce D. Perry, M.D.
Patients
David Vetter (1971–1984) – severe combined immune deficiency syndrome (a.k.a., The Bubble Boy)
The Mata Twins (2014–present) - formerly conjoined twins that underwent a 26-hour operation to be surgically separated

Gallery

See also 

 List of children's hospitals in the United States
 Baylor College of Medicine
 Texas Medical Center

References

External links

Hospital buildings completed in 1954
Hospitals in Houston
Children's hospitals in the United States
Institutions in the Texas Medical Center
1954 establishments in Texas
Hospitals established in 1954
Women's hospitals
Pediatric trauma centers
Children's hospitals in Texas